Yam Seng Pte Ltd v International Trade Corporation Ltd [2013] EWHC 111 is an English contract law case, concerning the principle of good faith. The case posited that English law should recognize a limited form of good faith as an implied contract term.

Facts
In 2009, ITC (International Trade Corporation) gave Yam Seng the exclusive rights to distribute ‘Manchester United’ fragrances in parts of the Middle East, Asia, Africa and Australia. In July 2010, Yam Seng was terminated because ITC allegedly repudiated the agreement by threatening to use another distributor and breaching the implied term of good faith performance by giving false information through Mr. Presswell to Yam Seng’s Mr. Tuli.

Judgment
Leggatt J held that there was a duty to be honest, which is part of good faith, and that ITC had made a repudiatory breach of contract.

See also 
 English contract law

References

 
 

English contract case law
2013 in British law
2013 in case law